The 2017 Puerto Rico Leptospirosis outbreak was an outbreak of leptospirosis that affected Puerto Rico in the fall of 2017, following Hurricane Maria's landfall.
 
Cases of infectious diseases often spike in the aftermath of intense storms, with flooding and damage to infrastructure leading to a wide variety of problems that increase the chance for transmission and exposure of infectious diseases, including leptospirosis. Diseases transmitted from animals to humans are collectively known as zoonotic diseases. With climate change increasing the frequency and intensity of severe weather events, related public health implications are growing in scope and complexity. These implications include the need for increased surveillance of possible disease outbreaks, more robust workforce training and rapid response procedures, water, sanitation, pest control infrastructure improvements, and greater health care system resilience.

Background of leptospirosis outbreak

The Disease: Leptospirosis

Leptospirosis, caused by an infection of Leptospira bacteria, is likely the most ubiquitous disease transmitted between animals and humans globally, with over 870,000 cases and 49,000 deaths reported annually.  Caribbean islands like Puerto Rico have among the highest incidence rates of the disease, with climate, geographic, and socioeconomic factors interacting to increase risk to the population.

Infection due to either direct or indirect exposure to host animals that shed the bacteria in the urine, most commonly the brown rat and sometimes cattle, are the main sources of infection.  Haake and Levett claim that the global level of disease is expected to rise with demographic shifts that increase the number of urban poor in tropical regions that are subject to storms and flooding due to climate change.

The delayed onset of symptoms of leptospirosis can make it difficult to detect and distinguish. After an incubation period of typically 5 to 10 days, but potentially as early as 2 days and up to 30 days after infection, people infected with leptospira bacteria can develop flu-like symptoms including fever, chills, headache, myalgia (muscle pain), cough, vomiting, and diarrhea.  The early signs are vague and often too general to be able to make a confident presumptive diagnosis of leptospirosis.   In some cases, patients may present with only febrile illness with other differentials considered including meningitis, influenza, sepsis and many others.  Other patients will present with the fulminant infection exhibiting signs of end stage liver failure, acute renal failure or severe pulmonary hemorrhage syndrome (SPHS).  The test considered to be the gold standard for leptospirosis diagnosis by the WHO is one that is not very sensitive in the early stages of the disease, before the body has had a chance to mount a response. This test, the microagglutination test (MAT), is a serologic test that tests the level of antibodies created by the immune system in response to the leptospira bacteria.  Although this test has high specificity, it has low sensitivity, again indicating that it can miss many truly infected individuals.  It is typical that doctors will submit paired serum samples form early in the course of illness and then later in order to attempt to demonstrate a 4 fold rise in titer an indication of a positive results.  Additionally, individuals living in a leptospira endemic region may have relatively high initial MAT test that only indicate previous infection, but not necessarily disease.  Commonly, clinicians will submit blood and urine for PCR  testing, however this is often time sensitive in that samples should be collected before antibiotic treatment, and there is typically a delay of 1 to 5 days depending on the lab used.,

Response

An outbreak of leptospirosis may have affected survivors in the weeks following the hurricane. The bacterial infection is contracted through water contaminated with animal urine, with an incubation period of 2 to 30 days. Since large areas of Puerto Rico were without tap water, residents were forced to use other sources of water that may be contaminated, such as local streams. By October 23, four people were suspected of having died from the disease while 74 others were suspected of being infected. There were 18 confirmed cases, 4 confirmed deaths and 99 suspected cases by 7 November. Puerto Rico averages 5 cases of leptospirosis per month under normal conditions. Despite the possibility of an outbreak, officials did not deem the situation being as dire.

In July 2018, CNN in collaboration with the Center for Investigative Journalism (CPI), published an online article in which they had seven disease experts review an official Puerto Rico government mortality database. The seven experts all agreed that since the records listed such a large number of confirmed cases of the bacterial disease leptospirosis, Puerto Rico officials should have declared an "epidemic" or an "outbreak" after Hurricane Maria, instead of choosing to not declare that a leptospirosis outbreak had occurred. The data reviewed included 57 laboratory-confirmed cases of leptospirosis illnesses in 2017. Of those, 54 of them were reported after Hurricane Maria made landfall on 20 September 2017. The number of laboratory-confirmed cases amounted to at least a three-fold increase in cases compared to 2016 and 2015.

Government Response and Public Reaction
Many of Puerto Rico's essential public health, health care, and other government services were rendered inoperative in the immediate aftermath of Hurricane Maria. Two weeks after the storm, only 5% of electrical power had been restored to the island, 11% of cell phone towers had been fixed, approximately 50% of the supermarkets were open, 9 of 69 hospitals had been connected back to the electric grid, and less than 50% of water services had been re-established.  The slow pace of recovery from the storm itself fueled public anger toward the Puerto Rican and U.S. government for failing to prioritize the island's urgent needs.

As reports of a spike in leptospirosis illnesses and deaths in Puerto Rico spread, the  government came under heavy criticism for its response, or lack thereof, to news of a potential outbreak. Territorial officials were blamed for the perceived failure to properly equip disaster response workers who had to operate in flood waters, delays in laboratory testing to confirm leptospirosis cases (both among patients undergoing treatment and deceased individuals), and an unwillingness to report morbidity and mortality data related to leptospirosis once there was increased public scrutiny in response to the rise in deaths.

Despite the criticism that existed by the public, The Puerto Rico Department of Public (PRDOH) health denies a poor response.  PRDOH, with the main lab in San Juan, typically provides lab testing and surveillance of disease in the areas affected by Hurricane Maria. There are ancillary facilities located in Arecibo, Ponce, and Mayaguez.  According to Concepcion-Acevedo, et al. PRDOH requested assistance from CDC, CDC Foundation, and The Association of Public Health Laboratories (APHL) during the aftermath.  It is reported that there was severe damage of the laboratory facilities, specifically three essential lab sectors including the electrical power supply for the facility, physical structure of the laboratory, and damage of the equipment and chemical reagents from power loss and water leaks. The lab was able to create a temporary solution to transport samples from Puerto Rico in the direct aftermath of Hurricane Maria to the U.S. for surveillance and diagnostic/ confirmatory testing, thereby allowing the continual surveillance and diagnosis of high priority diseases while the rebuilding of the PRDOH facility and restoration of essential laboratory services could occur.

Despite the challenges, CDC reports successful transport and shipping of over 1700 samples in 4 months and the identification of close to 350 cases of what is referred to as 'high-priority infectious disease,' including leptospirosis.

Public health implications

Outbreak monitoring and Surveillance

Like most densely inhabited tropical islands, Puerto Rico has high concentrations of risk factors for zoonotic diseases like leptospirosis. Throughout the Caribbean, widespread poverty, a hot and steadily warming climate, invasive species, tourism, and lack of adequate infrastructure contribute to the persistence of endemic tropical diseases.

Leptospirosis outbreaks have occurred on Puerto Rico in previous years. In 1996, Hurricane Hortense caused serious damage and flooding on the island that led to a fourfold increase in leptospirosis cases and many deaths.  During the lead-up to Hurricane Maria, however, many health care providers later reported that they were not notified about the need to monitor and test for the illness. This failure to detect an increase in cases early on in the wake of Maria likely contributed to the illnesses and deaths that sparked public outcry.

Given these gaps in detection, it is likely that improved disease monitoring and testing could have helped prevent the storm-associated rise in leptospirosis deaths. Choosing the best methods for surveillance in this case can be vexing. Leptospirosis, in addition to being highly variable in disease expression, can pose the added challenge of showing few clinical signs in infected individuals for weeks at a time.  Because initial symptoms are indistinguishable from many other common illnesses and often do not progress beyond fever and gastrointestinal signs in terms of severity, most infections go unrecognized.

Experiences of medical and public health responders to Hurricane Maria point the way toward potential improvements to leptospirosis monitoring and surveillance strategies. The U.S. Department of Veterans Affairs (VA) and Centers for Disease Control and Prevention (CDC), which operate in multiple health campuses throughout Puerto Rico, established enhanced laboratory-based surveillance after the hurricane hit in order to monitor various infections at VA facilities for the possibility of an outbreak. Enhanced surveillance by the VA detected two DNA-confirmed cases of leptospirosis following the storm.  In addition to laboratory testing of disease cases, the VA tracked groupings of infectious disease syndromes such as pneumonia and gastrointestinal illness as share of total visits to emergency departments on the island to try to identify trends for improved planning and resource allocation.

A study of disease surveillance in Puerto Rico after a period of floods caused by Hurricane Hortense in 1996 found an increase in leptospirosis infections that were caught by laboratory tests for dengue fever. The dengue tests found leptospirosis that otherwise would most likely have gone undetected and possibly proven fatal in some cases.  This finding supports the need for readily available field laboratory testing for leptospirosis during flooding and other disruptive hydrologic events.

Bandara, et al. discuss the contribution of travel to the increasing caseload of leptospirosis, specifically in some countries. They describe an increase in reporting of leptospirosis suspected to be due to what is termed 'recreational exposure'.  They claim that international travel constitutes a major independent risk factor for contracting leptospirosis and that leptospirosis is rarely included in the general differential diagnosis outside of endemic regions. Depending on the test used, there may also be difficulty in currently identifying the infecting server due to geographic variability and there may be a distribution bias as the countries with the highest number of cases with positive leptospirosis assays are those in travelers whose origin is an endemic region such as US, Netherlands, Japan, France, Germany, Australia with appropriate testing facilities.

Monitoring invasive species can also provide insight into how Leptospira is being maintained in the environment. Benavidez et al.  demonstrate that rats, mice, and mongooses all contribute to spreading the bacteria in rural areas. Managing these invasive species and reducing their populations could help control the spread of leptospirosis by reducing chances of exposure. 

Public health authorities in endemic areas should have a responsibility to coordinate with regional authorities to monitor epidemiological trends with the goal of identifying geographical areas what would benefit from increased service provision and education, likewise correspondence with tourist activities or events expected to bring masses of people should involve measures to address primary and secondary prevention. Bandara et al. suggests prophylactic antibiotic use when individuals are involved with high-risk activities.

Climate

Warm temperatures, storms, adverse living conditions, poverty, and harmful land use policies all contribute to increased risk for leptospirosis. As global climate change continues to drive convergence of these factors, especially in tropical islands like Puerto Rico, local public health officials and their governments face a multitude of challenges. Leptospira bacteria can survive longer at higher temperatures, with more human cases observed during summer months. Increased rainfall and flooding associated with climate change opens up transmission pathways for leptospirosis and other zoonotic diseases, such as damaged sanitation and water treatment systems, flooded farms, and rodents or other animals seeking shelter and dry land.

Puerto Rico is at a particularly elevated risk of infectious disease outbreaks related to climate change. The U.S. island's small size, remoteness from the mainland, low socioeconomic status, and high population density all magnify the population's exposure and susceptibility to illnesses like leptospirosis.  As warmer air and water lead to increased precipitation and more energetic hurricanes, the island will need to adapt and build systems that mitigate climate-linked infectious disease transmission. Public health officials will need to strengthen the essentials of urban sanitation as flooding not only overwhelms sewer and drainage systems, it also spreads garbage and debris throughout the environment that increases chances of transient contact between humans and animals.

Intensifying climate events and related environmental factors will continue to shape transmission of leptospirosis in places like Puerto Rico. Surveillance and predictive modeling efforts utilizing Geographic Information Science can help predict locations of future outbreaks with key factors, such as local infrastructure, rainfall effects, and human and animal population densities.  Braiding climate-informed predictive analytics with hardened water, sanitation, and public health infrastructure will be essential to prevent endemic disease in Puerto Rico from becoming seasonal high mortality events.

Health Care Systems

As a relatively small island with high levels of socioeconomic inequity before Hurricane Maria, Puerto Rico lacked a health care infrastructure that was capable of withstanding and fully responding to Hurricane Maria. Beyond the destructive power of the storm and floods, weeks without power and clean water took an immense toll on countless patients and an already overburdened, overworked, and underpaid workforce. People with serious illnesses had their treatments interrupted for weeks, including many who required dialysis for kidney failure. Disruptions in treatment for diabetes and other chronic illnesses underscore Puerto Rico's profound health inequities, thereby exacerbating the high rates of preventable and poorly treated physical illnesses linked to poverty, mental health and substance use issues in the aftermath of the hurricane.

A key intersection of environmental and occupational health and leptospirosis prevention is the activity of health care, emergency response, and other disaster relief workers after heavy rainfall and flooding events. As paramedics, rescue workers, and residents wade through flood waters, they risk direct exposure to leptospira bacteria. This exposure can be mitigated with the use of protective clothing and gear, including proper coverage of wounds, but health care and emergency response systems in low-income urban environments often lack the awareness, training, and material resources necessary to put those precautions in place.  Proper bandages, waterproof gear, abrasion-resistant gloves, and face coverings help reduce leptospirosis infections among people who have to move through flood waters. Prophylactic antibiotics to counter diseases like malaria and leptospirosis are also suggested for medical responders. The Puerto Rican government came under fire in the wake of Hurricane Maria for failing to provide protective equipment to relief workers who later contracted leptospirosis and died.

For many Puerto Ricans with chronic illnesses, pharmacies were the first line of response to the disruption in health care services caused by Hurricane Maria, not primary care providers. Pharmacists reported that a lack of telecommunications, electronic health records, and other essential data posed additional health risks. Improving access to pharmaceutical services and removing bureaucratic obstacles to obtaining essential medications, including psychiatric prescriptions, is a key consideration in protecting public health in the face of growing weather and other disasters.

Socioeconomic Factors

Leptospirosis transmission is shaped by the complex intersections of climate, geography, and socioeconomic factors. In places like Puerto Rico, these factors converge to disproportionately affect people living in poor, urban areas that experience warm temperatures and heavy rainfall. Not only is the risk for leptospirosis in the environment higher in these areas, its potential deadliness as an infection is magnified by the adverse social determinants of health affecting people in these communities. Studies in low-income regions throughout the world indicate that, even controlling for environmental factors, socioeconomic status plays a major role in risk for leptospirosis and the severity of its effects. Communities with high levels of poverty experience higher likelihood of morbidity and mortality for leptospirosis attributable to relative socioeconomic status. To mitigate the risks associated with poverty, climate change, and endemic diseases like leptospirosis in Puerto Rico, the island's territorial government and the rest of the U.S. must address major underlying socioeconomic and political inequities.

In workplace and shared public environments, many pathways for leptospirosis transmission can be addressed by waste removal and occupational health precautions. The prevalence of the disease in poor, urban areas complicates this approach, as private dwellings are more likely to become sites for contact between animals, contaminated water, soil, food, and humans. Residents of these impoverished communities typically lack the resources to address such environmental risks individually, and adverse socioeconomic factors pose additional barriers to implementing widespread prevention strategies.  Many people in these areas also perform the majority of the labor to clean up in the wake of flooding, typically without any training or protective equipment. This cleaning activity has been shown to increase infections and spread leptospirosis throughout poor urban environments. In September 2018, millions of bottles of clean water from FEMA intended for hurricane victims were found on an airport runway in Ceiba, apparently never distributed due to government mismanagement.

See also 

 Hurricane Maria
 List of epidemics

References 

Disease outbreaks in Puerto Rico
2017 in Puerto Rico
2017 in North America